This is a list of seasons completed by the Spokane Shock and Spokane Empire. The Shock are a professional Indoor American football franchise based in Spokane, Washington, playing home games at Spokane Veterans Memorial Arena.

The team was established in 2006 as a member of arenafootball2 (AF2). In the franchise's first season, the Shock won the ArenaCup, the AF2's championship game. The Shock were champions again in 2009, the AF2's final season before the league effectively dissolved. On September 28, 2009, the Shock, along with most AF2 teams, announced they would join the new Arena Football One, which after a December 2009 auction of the former Arena Football League's assets, became the new Arena Football League (AFL). In 2010, the Shock were crowned champions of the AFL by winning ArenaBowl XXIII. Until the 2011 season, the Shock finished with the best record in their division every year the first five years of their existence.

In 2016, the franchise joined the Indoor Football League (IFL) as the Spokane Empire due to trademark issues over the Shock name in the AFL. The Empire ceased operations in 2017, but was resurrected for the 2020 season under the Shock name.

References
General
 

Specific

Arena Football League seasons by team
Spokane Shock seasons
Washington (state) sports-related lists